Ross Hammond (born August 10, 1977) is a jazz guitarist and concert promoter. He co-founded the In the Flow Jazz and Improvisational Music Festival, which has been held annually in Sacramento, California, since 2008.

Career
Hammond was born August 10, 1977, in Lexington, Kentucky. He moved to Sacramento when he was 10 years old. Hammond started playing guitar, a gift from his mother, two years later. He wanted to play drums, but his mother was in favor of the more portable guitar. Hammond played rock, funk, and soul music in high school. He graduated from Christian Brothers High School in 1995.

He attended California State University Sacramento, where he received a degree in communication in 1999. "I was taking lessons from a really good guitar teacher named Jim Beeler, and he introduced me to Kenny Burrell and Grant Green and Wes Montgomery and Mark Whitfield. It was a step further than what I was already doing." While studying at CSUS, Hammond started a band called Chile Palmer.

His recording career as a leader began in 2003 with the album Gauche, followed by Optimism (2004), Sometimes Nocturnal (2005), Ross Hammond's Teakayo Mission (2007), Duets (2008), and Effective Use of Space (2009).

In 2008, Hammond and Byron Blackburn co-founded the In the Flow Jazz and Improvisational Music Festival. The festival emphasizes free form jazz and takes place annually in Sacramento.

Hammond started the new decade with the solo guitar album Ambience, Antiquite and Other Love Songs (2010). In 2012, he formed the Ross Hammond Quartet with multi-instrumentalist Vinny Golia, drummer Alex Cline, and bassist Steuart Liebig. The quartet released Adored in 2012 and Cathedrals in 2013. Both albums were recorded live in one day in a style reminiscent of classic jazz albums. Cathedrals received a four-star review in Downbeat and was named one of the top jazz releases of 2013. Jazz critic Ted Gioia named the album Upward (2016) by Hammond and Sameer Gupta thirty-fifth in his top 100 albums of the year.

Hammond plays in a duo with drummer Scott Amendola called Lovely Builders and in Electropoetic Coffee with poet NSAA (Lawrence Dinkins). He has also worked with Adam Lane, Alan Cook, Alex Jenkins, Calvin Weston, Darren Johnston, Devin Hoff, Dwight Trible, G. E. Stinson, John Hanes, Ken Filiano, Kevin Corcoran, Kevin Seconds, Mike Pride, Murray Campbell, Oliver Lake, Sameer Gupta, Steve Adams, and Vinny Golia.

Selected discography

As leader
 Gauche (2003) with Sameer Gupta and Gerry Pineda
 Optimism (2004) with Tom Monson and Gerry Pineda
 Sometimes Nocturnal (2005)
 Ross Hammond's Teakayo Mission (2007) 
 Duets (2008)
 An Effective Use of Space (2009) 
 Ambience, Antiquite and Other Love Songs (2010)
 Adored (2012) 
 Cathedrals (2013)
 Mean Crow (2015) with Luke Stewart and Nate Scheible

As co-leader/sideman
 Race Quintet: Travels (2004) Ross Hammond, Tony Passarell, Tom Monson, Erik Kleven, and Scott Anderson
 The Ni Project (2005)
 V Neck (2007) 
 Electropoetic Coffee (2011)
 Revival Trio (2012)
 Amy Reed (2013)
 Upward (2016) with Sameer Gupta

References

External links 
 

American jazz guitarists
Living people
1977 births
21st-century American guitarists